Arab Blues is a 2019 French-Tunisian comedy film directed by Manele Labidi Labbé in her feature debut. It was screened in the Venice Days section at the 2019 Venice Film Festival and then in the Contemporary World Cinema section at the 2019 Toronto International Film Festival. The film is about a Tunisian psychoanalyst Selma who, after having been educated in Paris, moves back to Tunisia and opens a psychoanalytic practice there.

Cast
 Golshifteh Farahani as Selma
 Hichem Yacoubi as Raouf
 Moncef Anjegui as Mourad
 Majd Mastoura as Naim

Release
The film had its world premiere at the 76th Venice International Film Festival, during the Venice Days, on 4 September 2019. Its North American debut was in the Contemporary World Cinema section at the 2019 Toronto International Film Festival on 8 September 2019.

Reception

Box office
Arab Blues grossed $3.7 million worldwide, against a production budget of about $2.4 million.

Critical response
On French review aggregator AlloCiné, the film holds an average rating of 3.7 out of 5, based on 24 critics' reviews.

References

External links
 

2019 films
2019 comedy films
2019 directorial debut films
French comedy films
2010s Arabic-language films
2010s French-language films
Films about psychoanalysis
Films set in Tunisia
Tunisian comedy films
2019 multilingual films
French multilingual films
Tunisian multilingual films
2010s French films